Alain Marcel (1952 — 9 March 2020) was an Algerian-born French music composer and author. An important figure of musical theatre and musical comedy in the 1980s, he notably adapted the French versions of Little Shop of Horrors, Kiss Me, Kate, and La Cage aux Folles.

Biography
Marcel studied musical theatre at the Conservatoire de Tours, then at the Conservatoire de Paris. He wrote his first song in 1975 when he was a student of Antoine Vitez.

Marcel initially acted in television and films, while also composing, producing, and appearing in theatrical productions such as Essayez donc nos pédalos and Rayon femmes fortes. In total, he was involved in 570 performances. Essayez donc nos pédalos was choreographed by Tonie Marshall, and it explored homosexuality while it was still criminal.

His greatest success was in the field of musical theatre. He starred in the French versions of Little Shop of Horrors, Kiss Me, Kate, and La Cage aux Folles. He performed at the Théâtre Déjazet, Théâtre de la Porte Saint-Martin, Casino de Paris, and Théâtre Mogador.

In the 2000s, Marcel gradually returned to music, composing music for the shows Le Paris d'Aziz et Mamadou, L'Opéra de Sarah (both at the Théâtre de l'Œuvre), and Encore un tour de pédalos.

Alain Marcel died on 9 March 2020, at the age of 68.

Theatre

Actor
Le Sexe faible (1974)
Les papas naissent dans les armoires (1978)
Essayez donc nos pédalos (1979)
Lulu (2003)
Perthus (2008)
Rue de Babylone (2012)
Le Banquet d'Auteuil (2014)

Director
Scènes de chasse en Bavière (1975)
Essayez donc nos pédalos (1979)
Rayon femmes fortes (1983)
Le Barbier de Séville (1983)
L'Italienne à Alger (1984)
Les Mariés de la tour Eiffel (1985)
La Petite Boutique des horreurs (1986)
Tam tam au pays des noirs-blancs (1986)
Palier de crabes (1987)
Peter Pan (1991)
Kiss Me, Kate (1992)
La Cage aux folles (1999)
Le Paris d'Aziz et Mamadou (2004)
Perthus (2008)
L'Opéra de Sarah - avant l'Amérique (2009)
Encore un tour de pédalos (2010)

Author
Essayez donc nos pédalos (1979)
Rayon femmes fortes (1983)
Le Paris d'Aziz et Mamadou (2004)
Algérie Chérie (2009)
L'Opéra de Sarah - avant l'Amérique (2009)
Encore un tour de pédalos (2010)

Composer
Essayez donc nos pédalos (1979)
Rayon femmes fortes (1983)
Si jamais je te pince !... (1980)
Le Paris d'Aziz et Mamadou (2004)
Encore un tour de pédalos (2010)

Filmography

Films
 Gloria (1977)
Rape of Love (1978)
Diva (1981)
The Cheat (1984)

Television
Jean-Christophe (1978)
Ce diable d'homme (1978)
Une femme, une époque (1978)
Les Eygletière (1978)
Elle voulait faire du cinéma (1983)

References

1952 births
2020 deaths
French male composers
French male television actors
French male film actors
French male musical theatre actors
20th-century French composers
20th-century French male actors
20th-century French male musicians
21st-century French composers
21st-century French male actors
21st-century French male musicians
French musical theatre composers
Conservatoire de Paris alumni